Pope Theodosius of Alexandria may refer to:

Pope Theodosius I of Alexandria, ruled in 535–567
Pope Theodosius II of Alexandria, ruled in 730–742
Pope Theodosius III of Alexandria, ruled in 1293–1300